Eduard Azaryan (born 11 April 1958) is a former Soviet Armenian artistic gymnast. He is an Olympic Champion and four-time Soviet Champion. Azaryan was awarded the Honoured Master of Sport of the USSR title in 1980. He is the son of Albert Azaryan.

Biography
Eduard started gymnastics in his early childhood under the guidance of his father, a three-time Olympic champion Albert Azaryan. In 1978, Eduard Azaryan became USSR champion in the team all-around and joined the USSR national gymnastics team. In the same year, Azaryan won a bronze medal at the World Cup in the individual all-around and a silver medal at the 1978 World Artistic Gymnastics Championships in the team all-around.

Azaryan competed at the 1980 Summer Olympics in every artistic gymnastic event. He won a gold medal in the team all-around.

References

External links
 
 
 
  

1958 births
Living people
Sportspeople from Yerevan
Soviet male artistic gymnasts
Armenian male artistic gymnasts
Honoured Masters of Sport of the USSR
Olympic gymnasts of the Soviet Union
Gymnasts at the 1980 Summer Olympics
Olympic gold medalists for the Soviet Union
Olympic medalists in gymnastics
Soviet Armenians
Medalists at the 1980 Summer Olympics
Medalists at the World Artistic Gymnastics Championships